Cornell Fleischer is an American historian who is the Kanuni Suleyman Professor of Ottoman and Modern Turkish Studies at the University of Chicago.

Education and career
Fleischer received his PhD from Princeton University in 1982. After leaving Princeton, Fleischer held teaching posts at Washington University in St. Louis and the Ohio State University.  He published his dissertation as his only book in 1986. The MacArthur Fellows Program awarded Fleischer what is colloquially knows as its genius grant in 1988, which is "a five-year grant to individuals who show exceptional creativity in their work and the prospect for still more in the future".  In 1993, Fleischer joined the faculty of the University of Chicago.  Fleischer focuses primarily on Ottoman history, specializing in the Age of Süleyman. Currently he is developing on a major work on Süleyman the Lawgiver while utilizing a number of papers dealing with the time period. He also works on apocalypticism and its relationship to his field of study. Fleischer is also a former director of the University of Chicago's Center for Middle Eastern Studies and a member of the editorial board of Historians of the Ottoman Empire.

Publications
Bureaucrat and Intellectual in the Ottoman Empire: The Historian Mustafa Âli (1541-1600). Princeton, NJ: Princeton University Press, 1986.
Gülru Necipoğlu, Cemal Kafadar, and Cornell H. Fleischer (eds.), Treasures of Knowledge. An Inventory of the Ottoman Palace Library (1502/3-1503/4). 2 vols. Leiden: Brill, 2019.
"From Şeyhzade Korkud to Mustafa Âli: Cultural Origins of the Ottoman Nasihatname," in IIIrd Congress on the Social and Political History of Turkey. Princeton University 24–26 August 1983, eds. Heath W. Lowry and Ralph S. Hattox (Istanbul: The Isis Press, 1990), 67-77. 
“The Lawgiver as Messiah: The Making of the Imperial Image in the Reign of Süleymân,” in Soliman le magnifique et son temps, ed. Gilles Veinstein. (Paris: Documentation française, 1992), 159-177.
"Secretaries Dreams: Augury and Angst in the Ottoman Scribal Service," in Armagan: Festschrift fur Andreas Tietze (Prague, 1994).
"Between the Lines: Realities of Scribal Life in the Sixteenth Century," in Studies in Ottoman History in Honour of V. L., eds. Colin Heywood and Colin Imber (Istanbul: The Isis Press, 1994), 45-61.
“Seer to the Sultan: Haydar‑i Remmal and Sultan Süleyman,” in Cultural Horizons. A Festschrift in Honor of Talat S. Halman, ed. Jayne L. Warner (Syracuse: Syracuse University Press, 2001), 290‑304.
“Shadows of Shadows: Prophecy in Politics in 1530s Istanbul,” International Journal of Turkish Studies 13 (2007): 51‑62.
"Of Gender and Servitude, ca. 1520: Two Petitions of the Kul Kizi of Bergama to Sultan Süleyman," in Mélanges en l'Honneur du Prof. Dr. Suraiya Faroqhi, ed. Abdeljelil Temimi (Tunis: Publications de la Fondation Temimi, 2009), 143-151. 
“Ancient Wisdom and New Sciences: Prophecies at the Ottoman  Court in the Fifteenth and Early Sixteenth Centuries,” in Falnama. The Book of Omens, eds. Massumeh Farhad and Serpil Bağcı (Washington, 2009), 232‑43.
"Companions to King Errant: Babur and his Lieutenants to the Conquest of Kabul," in Horizons of the World: Festschrift for İsenbike Togan (Istanbul: İthaki, 2011), 545-556.
"A Mediterranean Apocalypse: Prophecies of Empire in the Fifteenth and Sixteenth Centuries," Journal of the Economic and Social History of the Orient 61(2018): 18-90 [Special issue: Speaking the End Times: Early Modern Politics and Religion from Iberia to Central Asia, ed. Mayte Green-Mercado].

See also 
Center for Middle Eastern Studies at the University of Chicago
Islamic scholars

References

External links
Center for Middle Eastern Studies website (University of Chicago)
Department of Near Eastern Languages and Civilizations page
Department of History page
MacArthur Foundation page

Middle Eastern studies in the United States
MacArthur Fellows
Turkologists
Scholars of Ottoman history
University of Chicago faculty
Washington University in St. Louis faculty
Living people
Year of birth missing (living people)